Hades is a 1995 German drama film directed by and starring Herbert Achternbusch. It was entered into the 45th Berlin International Film Festival.

Cast
 Herbert Achternbusch as Hades
 Eckhard Dilssner as Polizist
 Barbara Gass
 Jens Harzer
 Irm Hermann
 Thomas Holtzmann
 Simone Katz
 Maxim Kisselev
 Laura Olivi
 Dagmar Sachse
 Bernhard Wildegger
 Rosel Zech

References

External links

1995 films
German drama films
1990s German-language films
1995 drama films
Films directed by Herbert Achternbusch
German avant-garde and experimental films
1990s avant-garde and experimental films
1990s German films